The 1965–66 Bradford City A.F.C. season was the 53rd in the club's history.

The club finished 23rd in Division Four (and were re-elected to retain their Football League status), reached the 1st round of the FA Cup, and the 1st round of the League Cup.

Sources

References

Bradford City A.F.C. seasons
Bradford City